Alpha Beta Christian College (ABCC) is a private co-educational secondary school founded in 2004. It is located in Dansoman, Accra, Ghana, and offers the Cambridge International Programmes IGCSE (International General Certificate of Secondary Education) and A-Levels.

Curriculum 
ABCC offers the British curriculum in forms 1-3 (Pre-IGCSE), forms 4-5 (IGCSE) and Lower and Upper Sixth (A-Levels). In addition to standard academic subjects, ABCC also offers Sports, Art, PE, Foundations for Living, Leadership programmes, Community service and a Career and Counselling service.

Accreditations and membership 
ABCC is a CIE British Council Attached Centre and is also a member of the Association of Christian Schools International (ACSI). ABCC is also a member of the International Schools Sports Association of Ghana (ISSAG).

Facilities 
ABCC has modern spacious classrooms, a fully equipped science laboratory, a library, art room, music room, IT Laboratory with 24-hour internet access, electronic whiteboards and CCTV security cameras. On-site sports facilities include basketball and volleyball courts. There are also hostel facilities for students who wish board.

Awards 
Best British Council Attached Centre for IGCSE 2009
Best British Council Attached Centre for AS/A Level 2010

References 

http://www.alphabeta.edu.gh
https://archive.today/20131120213049/http://www.preparationforlife.com/index.php?module=newsmodule&action=view&id=79

Education in Accra
Educational institutions established in 2004
2004 establishments in Ghana